The Two of Us is the debut album by the R&B duo Yarbrough & Peoples, released in 1980 on Mercury Records. It was produced by LA based producer Lonnie Simmons, who would go on to form Total Experience Records the following year, and veteran songwriter Jonah Ellis.

Reception

The Two of Us contained the couple's biggest hit, "Don't Stop the Music", which went to #1 on the R&B charts, #26 on the dance charts, and #19 on the pop charts. The album peaked at #1 on the R&B Charts and #16 on the pop charts.

Track listing
"Don't Stop the Music" 7:49 (Alisa Peoples, Lonnie Simmons, Jonah Ellis)
"Crazy" 3:54 (Peoples, Calvin Yarbrough)
"Third Degree" 4:54 (Ellis)
"Easy Tonight" 3:38 (Ellis)
"Want You Back Again" 4:15 (Vice, Yarbrough, Peoples) 
"Come to Me" 4:36 (Yarbrough, Peoples, Simmons)
"You're My Song" 4:58 (Ellis, Simmons)
"Two of Us" 4:15 (Yarbrough, Peoples)
"I Believe I'm Falling in Love" 3:52 (Ellis)

Personnel
Cavin Yarbrough & Alisa Peoples - Keyboards, Synthesizer, Percussion, Lead and Backing Vocals
Robert "Goodie" Whitfield, Temple McKinney - Keyboards, Backing Vocals
Dionne "Flea" Oliver, Michael McKinney - Bass
Victor "Widetrack" Hill - Bass, Backing Vocals
Michael Wycoff, Patrick Moten - Keyboards
J.P. "Sugarfoot" Moffett, Melvin Webb, Raymond Calhoun - Drums
Butch Bonner, Jimmy Macon,  Wes Blackman, Jonah Ellis - Guitar
Loftin "Boots" Gray, Paulinho Da Costa - Percussion
Benjamin Wright, Malvin "Dino" Vice - Horn & String Arrangements
Jim Gilstrap, Julia Waters, Maxine Waters, Pat Peterson - Backing Vocals

Production
Produced By Lonnie Simmons & Jonah Ellis for Total Experience Productions, except "Want You Back Again" & "Come To Me"; produced by Lonnie Simmons & Malvin "Dino" Vice
Horn and String Arrangements by Benjamin Wright and Malvin Dino Vice
Recording & Mix Engineers: Steve McMillan, Michael Evans & Jack Rouben, except "Crazy" & "Third Degree"; mixed by Rick Gianatos & Bob Stone
Remixes by Michael Evans & Steve McMillan
Mastered by Bob Carbone
All Songs Copyright Blackwell Publishing

Charts

Singles

See also
List of number-one R&B albums of 1981 (U.S.)

External links
 Yarbrough & Peoples-The Two Of Us at Discogs

References

1980 debut albums
Mercury Records albums
Boogie albums
Albums recorded at Total Experience Recording Studios